Guy William "Butch" Spicola (born February 27, 1938) is an American lawyer, former judge and former politician from Florida.

Biography
Spicola was born in Tampa. An attorney, he attended the University of Florida, earning a Bachelor of Arts degree in 1960 and a Bachelor of Laws degree in 1962. From 1963 to 1965 he served as the City Prosecutor for Temple Terrace, Florida under Mayor George Fee.

In 1966, he was elected to the Florida House of Representatives  for the 64th district. He was redistricted to the 62nd district in 1971, and the 69th district in 1973. He was elected to the State Senate for the 22nd district in 1974 and served until 1979. He was a member of the Democratic Party until the late 1970s when he switched to the Republican Party. He also served for the 36th district where he succeeded John R. Culbreath.

He was appointed a Circuit Judge in 1980 and served until 1997 when he became a partner in the law firm of Holland & Knight until 2002 when he opened his own practice in Tampa.

He is married to Georgie Blevens and they have two children.

References

Living people
1938 births
Florida Democrats
Florida Republicans
Florida lawyers
Florida state senators
Florida city attorneys
University of Florida alumni
Fredric G. Levin College of Law alumni
Members of the Florida House of Representatives
Politicians from Tampa, Florida
20th-century American lawyers
20th-century American judges
21st-century American lawyers